Chusnunia Chalim (born 12 July 1982) is an Indonesian politician who is the Vice governor of Lampung. She was the regent of East Lampung Regency, and is the first woman to hold the office. She was also a member of the People's Representative Council's delegation to the ASEAN Inter-Parliamentary Assembly in 2012.

Chalim has promoted the regency as an international tourism destination through its natural beauty. Six elephant calves have been born at Way Kambas National Park during the first two years of her tenure, one of which she named herself. A few months after taking office, she led a festival at the Park which included playing soccer with eggplants and a cracker-eating contest.

Following Lampung's 2018 gubernatorial election, Chalim was elected as vice governor of Lampung, with Arinal Djunaidi becoming governor. They were sworn in on 12 June 2019.

References

1982 births
Women regents of places in Indonesia
Living people
National Awakening Party politicians
People from Lampung
 
Vice Governors of Indonesian provinces